The 2016–17 European Rugby Challenge Cup pool stage was the first stage of competition in the third season of the European Rugby Challenge Cup.

It involved 20 teams competing, across 5 pools of 4 teams, for 8 quarter-final places – awarded to the 5 pool winners and the 3 top-ranked pool runners-up.

The pool stage began on 13 October 2016 and was completed on the weekend of 19–22 January 2017.

Seeding
The 20 competing teams were seeded and split into four tiers; seeding was based on performance in their respective domestic leagues. Where promotion and relegation is in effect in a league, the promoted team was seeded last, or (if multiple teams are promoted) by performance in the lower tier.

Teams was taken from a league in order of rank and put into a tier. A draw was used to allocate two second seeds to Tier 1; the remaining team went into Tier 2. This allocation indirectly determined which fourth-seeded team entered Tier 2, while the others entered Tier 3.

Given the nature of the Qualifying Competition, a competition including developing rugby nations and Italian clubs not competing in the Pro12, Rugby Europe 1 and Rugby Europe 2 were automatically included in Tier 4, despite officially being ranked 1/2 from that competition.

The brackets show each team's seeding and their league (for example, 1 Top 14 indicates the team was seeded 1st from the Top 14).

The following restrictions apply to the draw:
 The 5 pools each contain four clubs, one from each of the 4 Tiers.
 Each pool is required to have one club from each league, drawn from Tier 1, 2 or 3. A second team will only be added to a pool during the Tier 4 allocation.

Pool stage
The draw took place on 29 June 2016 in Neuchâtel, Switzerland.

During the pool stage, the teams played the 3 other teams in their pool twice, both at home and away, Based on the result of the match, teams receive:
 4 points for a win,
 2 points for a draw,
 1 attacking bonus point for scoring four or more tries in a match,
 1 defensive bonus point for losing a match by seven points or less.

Following the pool stage, the five winners from each group progressed to the quarter-finals, along with the three best pool runners-up from the competition. In the event of a tie between two or more teams from the same pool, the following criteria were used as tie-breakers:
 The club with the greater number of competition points from only matches involving tied teams.
 If equal, the club with the best aggregate points difference from those matches.
 If equal, the club that scored the most tries in those matches.

If this did not separate teams, and/or the tie related to teams that did not play each other (i.e., in different pools), the following tie breakers were used:
 If equal, the club with the best aggregate points difference from the pool stage.
 The club that scored the most tries in the pool stage.
 If equal, the club with the fewest players suspended in the pool stage.
 If equal, the drawing of lots will determine a club's ranking.

Pool 1

 

Due to a frozen pitch at the main ground at the Stadio Comunale di Monigo complex, kick off was delayed by 2 hours and moved to a nearby training ground.

Pool 2

Due to a frozen pitch on the 8 December, the game was postponed to the following day.

Following this win, Ospreys were the first-ever team in the history of either European rugby competition to get 30 match points out of 30 at the pool stage.

Pool 3

Pool 4

Pool 5

Due to cancelling the game, Timișoara Saracens were fined €30,000. Stade Français were awarded 5 match points in lieu of playing.

See also
2016–17 European Rugby Challenge Cup

Notes

References

2016–17 European Rugby Challenge Cup
2016